Coraline is a musical with music and lyrics by Stephin Merritt and a book by David Greenspan. It is based on the 2002 novella of the same name by Neil Gaiman. The story follows Coraline Jones, a young girl who discovers a parallel world beyond a secret door in her new home. The world has everything Coraline dreams of, but hides an ominous secret.

Coraline premiered off-Broadway in June 2009, four months after the film adaptation's release.

Original production 
Coraline was commissioned in 2004 by St. Ann Warehouse in association with Meet the Composer Commissioning Music/USA. The musical approached completion in 2008, but was not premiered until the following year.

Coraline began previews on May 8, 2009 at the Lucille Lortel Theatre. It premiered on June 1, 2009 and was originally scheduled to close on June 20. Due to popular demand, its run was extended first to July 5, then July 7. Coraline was produced by MCC Theater in association with True Love Productions. It was the first musical to be produced by MCC Theater.

The musical is "wildly unconventional", according to world-premiere director Leigh Silverman. West-coast premiere director Bill English describes the music as "odd," with pieces ending in the middles of phrases. The only instruments used in the musical are pianos, both traditional and toy varieties. The musical also calls for two prepared pianos.

The original production's cast was similarly unconventional, with 55-year-old Jayne Houdyshell as nine-year-old Coraline and librettist David Greenspan as the Other Mother. The cast also featured Julian Fleisher as Cat, Francis Jue as Father and Miss Forcible, January LaVoy as Mother and Miss Spink, Elliot Vallar as Mr Bobo, and William Youmans as Other Father.

Ghostlight Records released an original cast album in February 2010.

Other productions of note 
The West Coast premiere of Coraline played from November 16, 2010 to January 15, 2011 in San Francisco, produced by The SF Playhouse. The Midwest premiere played from August 8, 2014 to September 6, 2014 in Chicago, produced by Black Button Eyes Productions.

Coraline also premiered internationally in Canada during the Edmonton Fringe Festival, from August 15, 2013 to August 25, 2013. It was produced by Impossible Mongoose Productions.

Casts

Musical numbers

 Overture – Other Father; Mr. Bobo; Cat; Mother; Father;
 A New House – Coraline; Cat
 Am Miss Spink (And I Am Miss Forcible) – Mother; Father
 A Mouse Circus – Coraline; Mr. Bobo; Ensemble
 Mum and Dad – Coraline; Father; Mother
 At the Other End – Cat; Coraline
 Song of the Rats – Ensemble
 When We Were Young and Trod the Boards – Father; Mother
 Fluorescent Green Gloves – Coraline
 Welcome Home – Other Mother; Other Father; Ensemble
 A Lot of Noise – Ensemble
 Song of the Rats – Ensemble
 Theatre Is Fun – Father; Mother
 Stay with Us – Other Mother; Other Father; Ensemble
 The Ballad of The Wasps - Coraline
 O What a Lovely Trip – Father; Mother; Coraline
 Go to Sleep – Other Mother
 We Were Children Once – Ensemble
 When You're A Cat - Cat
 Song of the Rats – Ensemble
 Recollections – Other Father; Mr. Bobo; Father
 Whatever You Want – Mr. Bobo
 Song of the Rats – Ensemble
 The World Goes Flat – Ensemble
 I Saw a Show on Telly Once – Coraline
 Falling... Falling... – Other Mother; Ensemble
 One Long Fairytale – Other Mother; Cat; Father; Mother; Mr. Bobo; Other Father; Ensemble

Critical response
Many critics found the show lacked suspense and affect. Ben Brantley described the original off-Broadway production in The New York Times as "droll, dry, and very cerebral." In subsequent runs, critics echoed such negative criticisms. Robert Hurwitt wrote in the San Francisco Chronicle, "Greenspan's make-believe approach undercuts the tale's suspense." Kerry Reid wrote in the Chicago Tribune, "There needs to be a greater sense of clammy danger... as the shadows fall over the world... Without it, we never quite identify with Coraline's growing maturity."

Critics also found the quirky musical score and instrumentation too indistinct and unmemorable. Matthew Murray wrote in TalkingBroadway.com that the show lacks "musical necessity" and goes on to say, "It's not just that the songs give you nothing to take away, it's that they take in nothing to give you." More generally, Toby Zinman wrote on BroadStreetReview.com that attendees may find "the songs were unmusical."

While the show received generally negative-to-mixed reviews, critics remained supportive of its creative team. Noting the strength of Gaiman's novel, Greenspan's inventive theatrical work, and Merritt's quirky, esoteric musicianship, David Rooney wrote in Variety, "Whether or not the musical-theater crowd warms to this wildly unconventional piece, it succeeds fully in harnessing the essence of three distinctive talents." Additionally, Stephen Merritt received the Obie Award for Design/Music for Coraline in 2010.

References

2009 musicals
Musicals based on novels
Off-Broadway musicals